All This Love is the second studio album by DeBarge, released by Gordy Records on July 22, 1982.

Reception

After their first album saw limited success, this album featured productions and compositions by the DeBarge members, primarily led by singer El DeBarge, whose countertenor vocals (a mixture of tenor and falsetto) would lead the group to success throughout the mid-1980s.  Due to the release of the hit singles "I Like It" reaching number two on the R&B charts and the title track "All This Love" reaching number 5 on the R&B charts and number one on the Adult Contemporary charts, the album eventually reached gold status.

Track listing
"I'll Never Fall in Love Again" (El DeBarge/James DeBarge) - 4:37
"Stop! Don't Tease Me" (E. DeBarge) - 6:00
"I Like It" (Randy DeBarge/E. DeBarge/Bunny DeBarge) - 4:40
"Can't Stop" (Crossley/Nolen) - 4:05
"All This Love" (E. DeBarge) - 5:52
"It's Getting Stronger" (B. DeBarge) - 4:00
"Life Begins with You" (B. DeBarge) - 4:48
"I'm in Love with You" (M. DeBarge/ Bunny DeBarge) - 3:35

Production 
 Executive Producer – Berry Gordy Jr.
 Produced by Eldra DeBarge and Iris Gordy
 Co-Producers – Raymond Crossley and Curtis Anthony Nolen
 Engineers – Bobby Brooks, Milt Calice, Jane Clark, Steve MacMillan, Barney Perkins and Phillip Walters.
 Assistant Engineers – Steve Catania, Michael Craig Johnson and Kevin Sorrells.
 Mastered by John Matousek at Motown Recording Studios (Hollywood, CA).
 Art Direction – Johnny Lee and Terry Taylor
 Design – Terry Taylor
 Photography – Raul Vega

Personnel

DeBarge 
 Bunny DeBarge – backing vocals, lead vocals (6, 7), BGV arrangements 
 El DeBarge – keyboards, lead vocals (2–6, 8), backing vocals, rhythm arrangements (1–3, 5-8), horn arrangements (2), BGV arrangements
 James DeBarge – keyboards, backing vocals, lead vocals (1), rhythm arrangements (1), BGV arrangements
 Mark DeBarge – saxophone, trumpet, backing vocals, rhythm arrangements (8), BGV arrangements
 Randy DeBarge – bass, backing vocals, lead vocals (3), rhythm arrangements (3), BGV arrangements

Additional personnel 
 Raymond Crossley – keyboards, arrangements (4), BGV arrangements (4)
 Russell Ferrante – keyboards, rhythm arrangements (2, 3, 6, 7)
 Charles Fearing – guitars, acoustic guitar solo (5)
 José Feliciano – acoustic guitar 
 Robben Ford – guitars 
 Curtis Anthony Nolen – guitars, arrangements (4), BGV arrangements (4)
 Freddie Washington – bass 
 Ken Wild – bass
 Ollie E. Brown – drums 
 Ricky Lawson – drums 
 Richard Heath – percussion 
 Nate Hughes – percussion 
 Daniel LaMelle – alto saxophone, tenor saxophone, horn arrangements (1–3, 6), sax solo (6)
 Jeff Clayton – baritone saxophone, flute
 Gerald Albright – tenor saxophone
 Damon Rentie – tenor saxophone
 George Bohanon – trombone 
 John Ervin – trombone 
 Clay Lawrey – trombone
 Ray Brown – trumpet, flugelhorn 
 Cliff Ervin – trumpet
 Roy Poper – trumpet 
 Nolan Smith – trumpet, flugelhorn
 Linda Howard – BGV arrangements (1)
 Barbara Mitchell – BGV arrangements (1)
 Benjamin Wright – rhythm arrangements (1, 5, 8), horn and string arrangements (5, 7)
 Janice Gower – concertmaster (5, 7)

Charts

Weekly charts

Year-end charts

Certifications

References

External links
 DeBarge-All This Love at Discogs

1982 albums
DeBarge albums
Gordy Records albums